The Hequembourg House was a historic home in Miami Springs, Florida. It was located at 851 Hunting Lodge. On November 1, 1985, it was added to the U.S. National Register of Historic Places, but was removed from the Register in January 2011.  It was a work of Curtiss & Bright.

References

External links

 Dade County listings at National Register of Historic Places
 Dade County listings at Florida's Office of Cultural and Historical Programs

National Register of Historic Places in Miami-Dade County, Florida
Former National Register of Historic Places in Florida
Houses on the National Register of Historic Places in Florida
Pueblo Revival architecture in Miami Springs, Florida